Ostragehege is a multi-use sports venue in Dresden, Germany. Key buildings of the venue include the Heinz-Steyer-Stadion and the ice hockey stadium of the Dresdner Eislöwen (or Dresden ice lions). The stadium was the primary aiming point for No. 5 Group RAF squadron during the Dresden bombings of February 1945. Bomb runs were timed and direction calculated to fan out from this point, causing massive devastation and a fire-storm which killed tens of thousands of event watchers.

The slaughterhouse on the site was where Kurt Vonnegut was imprisoned in 1945, and where he set his novel Slaughterhouse-Five.

See also
 Rudolf-Harbig-Stadion
 Bombing of Dresden in World War II

Footnotes

History of sport in East Germany
Football venues in Germany
Buildings and structures in Dresden
Tourist attractions in Dresden
Sports venues in Saxony